The Battle of Suq al Ghazi took place on September 15, 2014.

The battle
On September 15, 2014, ISIL gunmen, accompanied by local jihadist militias, stormed an Iraqi military base. Not knowing what to do, the Iraqi soldiers made frantic calls for help. Inside the base, ISIL ordered the soldiers to get in a dozen trucks when they arrived. The ISIL fighters reportedly shot at civilians and anyone who tried to intervene before raising the ISIL Black Standard in place of the Iraqi Flag. 

After receiving calls from help, and seeing that ISIL intended to capture Suq al Ghazi, US, UK and French drones arrived and fired at ISIL positions, killing multiple fighters. The remaining ISIL fighters fled, only to be engaged by Iraqi tanks.

Iraqi tanks fired at the remaining fighters. US drones arrived and began bombing them as well.

Aftermath
ISIL permanently left Suq al Ghazi on September 16, 2014, making the battle the shortest one in the history of the conflict.

References

Conflicts in 2014
Military operations of the Iraqi Civil War in 2014
Military operations of the War in Iraq (2013–2017) involving the United States
Military operations of the War in Iraq (2013–2017) involving the Islamic State of Iraq and the Levant
Battles in 2014